Walter Meza (born December 8, 1966, Buenos Aires, Aregentina) is an Argentinian singer of thrash metal and heavy metal, known for being the singer of the band Horcas, from 1997 to the present.

Biography 
Walter Darío Meza was born in Buenos Aires City, moving on his first years to the town of San Justo in the city of La Matanza. He began his career in a group called Barloff. Later, when he was fourteen years old, he was the singer of the band Delay, band where also was Paul Mondello, current guitarist of the band Massacre. Also was part of the bands Samurai and Heinkel.

He later joined Jeriko, with some of the members of his former bands Heinkel and Retrosatan. With this lineup, they recorded a demo of four songs and reached the final of a contest sponsored by Yamaha, being able to play along other important groups like Hermética, Rata Blanca, Logos and Lethal.

Walter left the group in 1995 and in 1997 he became the singer of Horcas, the band of the former V8 guitarist, Osvaldo Civile, role he holds until  today.

With this group, he edited more than ten studio albums and performed along international bands like Pantera, Slayer, Iron Maiden, Sepultura, Stratovarius, Soulfly, Exodus, Megadeth, Metallica and Black Sabbath.

Discography

with Jeriko 
 1994 – Bajo mi Ley (demo)
 2004 – Jerikó

with Horcas 
 1997 – Vence
 1999 – Eternos
 2002 – Horcas
 2003 – Horcas vive
 2004 – Demencial
 2006 – Asesino
 2008 – Reviviendo huestes
 2010 – La maldición continúa
 2013 – Por tu honor

See also 
Argentine heavy metal

References

External links 

1966 births
Argentine heavy metal singers
20th-century Argentine male singers
Argentine rock singers
Thrash metal musicians
People from La Matanza Partido
Living people
Musicians from Buenos Aires
21st-century Argentine male singers